The Gemmill-Faust House is a historic house at 321 St. Andrew's Terrace in West Helena, Arkansas.  It is a two-story wood-frame structure with a brick-face exterior, built c. 1920.  The house is an excellent local example of the Prairie School of design, with its broad spreading eaves, hip roof with hipped dormer, light-colored brick, and ribbon windows throughout.  A period garage stands west of (behind) the main house.

The house was listed on the National Register of Historic Places in 1996.

See also
National Register of Historic Places listings in Phillips County, Arkansas

References

Houses on the National Register of Historic Places in Arkansas
Prairie School architecture in Arkansas
Houses completed in 1920
Houses in Phillips County, Arkansas
National Register of Historic Places in Phillips County, Arkansas